Hot R&B/Hip-Hop Songs is a chart published by Billboard that ranks the top-performing songs in the United States in African-American-oriented musical genres; the chart has undergone various name changes since its launch in 1942 to reflect the evolution of such genres.  In 1979, it was published under the title Hot Soul Singles.  During that year, 20 different singles topped the chart, based on playlists submitted by radio stations and surveys of retail sales outlets.

In September, Michael Jackson gained his first soul chart-topper as a solo artist with "Don't Stop 'Til You Get Enough".  The singer had previously achieved several soul number ones with his brothers as the Jackson 5, and had charted sporadically in his own right since 1971, but did not reach the top spot as a soloist until 1979.  Jackson would go on to become one of the most successful musicians of all time, selling hundreds of millions of records, and one of the defining artists of the 20th century.  Donna Summer also topped the soul listing for the first time in July with "Bad Girls".  Known as the "Queen of Disco", she had previously achieved five chart-toppers on the Disco Action chart.  In December, "I Wanna Be Your Lover" gave Prince his first number one, the first major success of a career which would take him to superstar status and see him regarded as one of the most innovative and influential musicians of his generation.  Eight other acts reached number one for the first time in their respective careers in 1979:  Cheryl Lynn, Chuck Brown & the Soul Searchers, Instant Funk, Sister Sledge, GQ, Peaches & Herb, Anita Ward, and McFadden & Whitehead.  Ward's single "Ring My Bell" was a major national and international success, topping the all-genre Hot 100 chart, but she would not be able to replicate its success and is regarded as a one-hit wonder.

Sister Sledge was the only act to have multiple soul number ones during the year, topping the chart with "He's the Greatest Dancer" in March and "We Are Family" in June, but these would prove to be the only chart-toppers for the sibling act.  The year's longest-running number one was "Good Times" by Chic, which spent six consecutive weeks in the top spot and was ranked by Billboard as the year's top soul song.  The year's final chart-topper was "Do You Love What You Feel" by Rufus and Chaka, which reached the top spot in the issue dated December 15 and stayed there for the remainder of the year.  Vocalist Chaka Khan had achieved her first solo number one the previous year, but continued to record with the band until 1983 alongside her ongoing solo career.

Chart history

See also
 List of Billboard Hot 100 number-one singles of 1979

References

1979 record charts
1979
1979 in American music